War World may refer to:

 War World (series), collaborative science fiction books set in the CoDominium universe of Jerry Pournelle
 War World (video game), a 2005 mech combat video game
 "War World", a 2002 episode of Justice League
 Warworld, a fictional planet in the DC Universe

See also
 World war (disambiguation)